The Ilford North by-election of 2 March 1978 was held after the death of Labour Member of Parliament (MP) Millie Miller  on 29 October 1977. The seat was gained by the Conservatives in a defeat for James Callaghan's government.

Results

 Alfred Burr was exposed as a convicted child abuser after nominations closed, resulting in the withdrawal of his endorsement by the New Britain Party and his withdrawal from election six days before the date of the by-election.

See also
1954 Ilford North by-election
1920 Ilford by-election

References

Sources
British Parliamentary Election Results 1974-1983, p. 27, compiled and edited by F.W.S. Craig (MacMillan Press 1983)

Ilford North by-election
Ilford North,1978
Ilford North,1978
Ilford North by-election
Ilford
Ilford North by-election